Pranayakalam (English: Season of Love) is a 2007 Malayalam romantic film directed by débutant Uday Ananthan.

Cast 
 Ajmal Ameer as Renjith
 Vimala Raman as Nancy
 Jithu Johny Panjikkaran as Deepu
 Murali as Stephen Varghese
 Seema
 Balachandra Menon as Ganeshan
 Thilakan as Krishnankutty
 Madhu Warrier as Narayanan
 Atlee
 Baburaj
 Lakshmy Ramakrishnan
 Sruthi Nair (Devika Rani)

Music
The music for the film was composed by Ouseppachan. All the songs from the movie became popular. especially "Oru Venalppuzhayil", which became hugely popular among youngsters.

Lyrics: Rafeeq Ahamed

 "Thulaseedala" - K. J. Yesudas
 "Anthinilaavinte" - Kalyani Menon
 "Ente Daivame" (F) - Sujatha Mohan
 "Ente Daivame" (M) - Vidhu Prathap
 "Etho Vidooramaam" - K. S. Chitra
 "Kari Raavin" - Franco, Sayanora Philip
 "Oru Venalppuzhayil" - Ranjith K. Govind
 "Parayu Prabhaathame" - Gayathri Asokan
 "Theme Song" - Ouseppachan

References

2007 films
2000s Malayalam-language films
Films scored by Ouseppachan